Vitaliy Bondarev (born 15 June 1985) is a retired Ukrainian professional footballer.

External links
 
 

1985 births
Living people
Ukrainian footballers
Association football forwards
Expatriate footballers in Belarus
Ukrainian expatriate footballers
FC Mariupol players
FC Dnepr Mogilev players
FC Zirka Kropyvnytskyi players